The 1930 Illinois Fighting Illini football team was an American football team that represented the University of Illinois during the 1930 college football season.  In their 18th season under head coach Robert Zuppke, the Illini compiled a 3–5 record and finished in eighth place in the Big Ten Conference. Guard Stan Bodman was selected as the team's most valuable player. Fullback Olaf E. Robinson was the team captain.

Schedule

References

Illinois
Illinois Fighting Illini football seasons
Illinois Fighting Illini football